The Great Lover may refer to:

nickname of actor Rudolph Valentino
nickname of John Gilbert
The Great Lover (play), a 1915 Broadway play
The Great Lover (1920 film), a 1920 American film directed by Frank Lloyd
The Great Lover (1931 film), a 1931 American film featuring Adolphe Menjou and Irene Dunne
The Great Lover (1949 film), a 1949 American comedy film starring Bob Hope and Rhonda Fleming
"The Great Lover", a poem by Rupert Brooke
The Great Lover (novel), a novel by Jill Dawson inspired by the Brooke poem